Alan William Harrington Rayment (29 May 1928 at Finchley, Middlesex - 27 October 2020 at Lymington, Hampshire) was an English first-class cricketer. He was a right-handed middle-order batsman. All but one of his first-class appearances were for Hampshire.

Cricket career
Rayment made his debut in first-class cricket for the Combined Services against Northamptonshire in 1947. This was the only first-class match he played for the Combined Services. He made his first-class debut for Hampshire two years later in the 1949 County Championship against Glamorgan. He represented Hampshire in 198 first-class matches from 1949 to 1958, making his final appearance for the county against Gloucestershire at the County Ground, Southampton.

In his 198 matches for the county, Rayment scored 6,338 runs at a batting average of 20.31, with 23 half centuries, 4 centuries and a highest score of 126 against Gloucestershire in 1953. His best season with the bat came in 1952 when he scored 1,056 runs at an average of 23.46, with three half centuries, two centuries and a high score of 106. He also made 1,000 runs exactly in the 1956 season.

Later life
He and his wife Betty were expert ballroom dancers, and ran a dancing school in Southampton from the late 1940s to the late 1950s. He spent a year as a cricket coach with MCC at Lord's in 1959, and after that was "in turn teacher, estate agent, community worker, postgraduate student, property developer and psychotherapist".

He died in Lymington Hospital on 27 October 2020.

References

External links
Alan Rayment at Cricinfo
Alan Rayment at CricketArchive
 Hampshire Cricket obituary 
"Punchy Through the Covers" 2013 autobiography

1928 births
2020 deaths
People from Finchley
English cricketers
Combined Services cricketers
Hampshire cricketers